Yurac Huayruro (possibly from Quechua yuraq white, wayruru a type of tree, Aymara wayruru red and black seeds of a plant (Abrus precatorius, Ormosia coccinea or Ormosia minor); also meaning something very beautiful, "white wayruru") is a mountain in the Vilcanota mountain range in the Andes of Peru, about  high. It is located in the Puno Region, Carabaya Province, Corani District, northeast of the large glaciated area of Quelccaya (Quechua for "snow plain"). Yurac Huayruro lies northwest of Tarucani and Jachatira and northeast of Cunorana.

References

Mountains of Puno Region
Mountains of Peru